Oakton Trolley Station is a historic trolley station located at Oakton, Fairfax County, Virginia.  The Washington, Arlington & Falls Church Railway, which operated electric trolleys that travelled between Fairfax City and downtown Washington, D.C., from 1904 to 1939, constructed the station in 1905.    The building has a three-story vernacular frame. It has a rectangular plan, with a wrap-around open porch, weatherboards and a tin roof. 

The trolley line used the building as a station until the line closed in 1939. A post office and a general store then used the building until it became a boarding house. The building was restored in 1988 as a single family dwelling.

On October 19, 1994, the Virginia Department of Historic Resources added the trolley station to the Virginia Landmarks Register. The National Park Service then added the station to the National Register of Historic Places on February 8, 1995. In 2011, the Northern Virginia Conservation Trust entered into an historic preservation agreement that legally protects the historic resource.

References

Railway stations on the National Register of Historic Places in Virginia
Railway stations in the United States opened in 1905
Buildings and structures in Fairfax County, Virginia
National Register of Historic Places in Fairfax County, Virginia
Railway stations closed in 1939